is a Japanese manga author and illustrator.

Works
  a yaoi manga.
  a yaoi manga.
 The manga adaption of the novel  by Pentabu which was based on a popular blog. The manga is translated in Chinese and recently German where it is published as Akihabara Shojo.

References

External links 
Rize Shinba's Website 

Living people
Manga artists
Year of birth missing (living people)